Jiří Polák (born August 10, 1977) is a Czech ice hockey defenceman playing in Slovakia with HK Nitra of the Slovak Extraliga. He has also played 468 games in the Czech Extraliga.

References

External links

Living people
HK Nitra players
MHC Martin players
Czech ice hockey defencemen
1977 births
Saale Bulls Halle players
Czech expatriate ice hockey players in Germany
Czech expatriate ice hockey players in Slovakia